Lichtenstein's sandgrouse (Pterocles lichtensteinii) is a species of bird in the Pteroclidae family, which is named after Martin Lichtenstein. They are nomadic, mostly nocturnal birds, which drink before dawn and after dusk.

Range
The species is found over a wide region, from near the equator in Kenya, through the Middle East to Afghanistan. In Africa it is besides found in Algeria, Chad, Djibouti, Egypt, Eritrea, Ethiopia, Libya, Mali, Mauritania, Morocco, Niger, Senegal, Somalia, Sudan and Uganda. In Asia it is also found in Iran, Iraq, Jordan, Oman, Pakistan, Palestine, Saudi Arabia, Israel, the United Arab Emirates and Yemen.

Races

There are five accepted races:
 P. l. targius von Schweppenburg, 1916 – Sahara and Sahel
 P. l. lichtensteinii Temminck, 1825 – Israel to Somalia and Socotra
 P. l. sukensis Neumann, 1909 – South Sudan to central Kenya
 P. l. ingramsi Bates & Kinnear, 1937 – local in Yemen
 P. l. arabicus Neumann, 1909 – Arabia to Pakistan

References

External links 
 Image at ADW

Lichtenstein's sandgrouse
Birds of North Africa
Birds of the Horn of Africa
Birds of the Middle East
Lichtenstein's sandgrouse
Taxonomy articles created by Polbot